Tapiwa Shumba (born 16 May 2003) is a Zimbabwean footballer who plays as a midfielder for New York Red Bulls II in the USL Championship via the New York Red Bulls Academy.

Born in Harare, Zimbabwe, Shumba moved to New Jersey in the United States and played prep soccer at Tenafly High School.

Career
Shumba played as a member of the Future Soccer Academy from 2008 before moving to New York Red Bulls in 2018.

During the 2020 USL Championship season Shumba appeared for New York Red Bulls II. He made his debut on 15 August 2020, starting in a fixture against Hartford Athletic.

References

External links 
 
 ussoccerda.com profile

2003 births
Living people
People from Tenafly, New Jersey
Tenafly High School alumni
Zimbabwean footballers
Zimbabwean emigrants to the United States
Zimbabwean expatriate footballers
New York Red Bulls II players
Association football midfielders
Soccer players from New Jersey
USL Championship players